Nomen may refer to:

Nomen (Roman name), the middle part of Ancient Roman names
Nomen (Ancient Egypt), the personal name of Ancient Egyptian pharaohs
Jaume Nomen (born 1960), Catalan astronomer
Nomen, Latin for a certain part of speech
Nomen, part of the FRSAD library model

See also
Nō-men, the mask used in Noh performances (see Noh#Masks)
Nomina (journal), published by the Society for Name Studies in Britain and Ireland